Mus lepidoides is a species of rodent in the family Muridae.

References
Fry, T.B. 1931: Proposed classification of the smaller Indian field (or jungle) mice. Journal of the Bombay Natural History Society, 34: 916–921. [not seen]
Shimada, T.; Aplin, K.P.; Suzuki, H. 2010: Mus lepidoides (Muridae, Rodentia) of central Burma is a distinct species of potentially great evolutionary and biogeographic significance. Zoological Science, 27(5): 449–459.

Mus (rodent)
Mammals described in 1931